Mercedes Schlapp ( Viana; born December 27, 1972) is an American communications specialist and political commentator for both English and Spanish media. She has served in two presidential administrations as director of specialty media under George W. Bush and as White House Director of Strategic Communications in the Trump administration from September 2017 to July 2019. She went on to work on the Trump 2020 re-election campaign as senior advisor for strategic communications.

She is also co-founder of Cove Strategies, and advises media strategy for corporate and nonprofit organizations.

Personal life 
Schlapp is a first generation Cuban-American born in Florida. She is married to Matt Schlapp, the chair of the American Conservative Union. The Schlapps have five daughters.

Schlapp credits her interest in politics to her father, who escaped captivity as a political prisoner of the Castro regime in 1960s Cuba.

Education
Schlapp earned a bachelor's degree from Florida International University and a master of public administration from George Washington University. In December 2019 she was awarded an FIU Medallion—Outstanding Alumna for her achievements.

Career

Campaigns and Bush administration 
Schlapp worked on local and national political campaigns, as well as the 2000 and 2004 presidential campaigns for George W. Bush, and was Director of Specialty Media in his administration.

Schlapp also worked as senior advisor for strategic communications on the Trump reelection campaign in 2020.

Media 
Schlapp has been a Fox News contributor and a columnist for several publications including U.S. News & World Report and The Washington Times. She is also a regular co-host of Prime News with Jenn Pellegrino on Newsmax TV.

Media Strategy 
Together with her husband Schlapp founded Cove Strategies, a media strategy and lobbying firm based in Alexandria, Virginia, in 2009. According to Open Secrets, the firm performs services mainly in the areas of telecommunications, trade, and health issues and earned greater income during the Trump administration than it did during the Obama administration.

NRA 
She was a board member of the National Rifle Association before joining the White House. She was an aid consultant at the NRA, earning $60,000 from the NRA in 2015, and $45,000 in 2016, according to NRA tax filings.

Trump administration
On September 12, 2017, President Donald Trump's administration announced that Schlapp would serve as Director of Strategic Communications. During her time with the Trump Administration, Schlapp focused on issues such as school safety, opioids, infrastructure and trade. Prior to joining the Trump administration, Schlapp made numerous statements that were strongly critical of Trump.

Schlapp attracted attention when she and her husband left the White House Correspondents Dinner early in April 2018, saying that she was disgusted by comedian Michelle Wolf's jokes aimed at Press Secretary Sarah Huckabee Sanders. In a limousine en route to an exclusive NBC/MSNBC afterparty, she tweeted that Wolf's comedy routine is "why America hates the out of touch leftist media elite".

In May 2018, Schlapp defended White House aide Kelly Sadler after she joked that John McCain's opposition to CIA Director nominee Gina Haspel was irrelevant because "he’s dying anyway".

George Floyd protests 
In June 2020, amid the George Floyd protests against racism and police brutality, she retweeted praise for a man who was wielding a chainsaw against protestors while he was yelling the N-word. After Politico asked for comment, she retweeted another account that posted the video of the chainsaw-wielding man but which muted the N-word. After Politico published the story, she apologized.

Political positions 
Schlapp opposes same-sex marriage. She called President Barack Obama’s decision to support it a "political ploy".

References

External links

 
 

1972 births
21st-century American writers
American politicians of Cuban descent
Florida International University alumni
Florida Republicans
George Washington University alumni
Living people
Tea Party movement activists
Trump administration personnel
Writers from Miami
Latino conservatism in the United States